The men's 50 metre backstroke event at the 2018 Commonwealth Games was held on 7 and 8 April at the Gold Coast Aquatic Centre.

Records
Prior to this competition, the existing world, Commonwealth and Games records were as follows:

Results

Heats
The heats were held on 7 April at 11:15.

Semifinals
The semifinals were held on 7 April at 20:19.

Semifinal 1

Semifinal 2

Final
The final was held on 8 April at 21:31.

References

Men's 50 metre backstroke
Commonwealth Games